Busturialdea, also named Busturialde - Urdaibai is a comarca of the province of Biscay, in the Basque Country, Spain. It is the heir of "Busturia", one of the original merindades that used to compose the province of Biscay – this should not be confused with Busturia, a municipality located in this region. Busturialdea is a diminished portion of the same original subregion and has two capital cities; Bermeo and Gernika-Lumo. It is one of the seven comarcas that compose the province of Biscay.

History 

Busturia used to be one of the merindades of Biscay and included a larger territory than the current one of Busturialdea, as it reached the province of Gipuzkoa.

Busturialdea was historically the core of Biscay: the capitals of the province, Bermeo and Gernika, were located in it; the village of Mundaka, also belonging to this region, had the privilege of speaking always first in the sessions of its parliament and for some time, the harbour of Bermeo was the main portuary facility, until Bilbao was founded in 1300.

Busturialdea and its lush estuary was also important in prehistory. Particularly significative is its site of Santimamiñe cave, that yielded a full sequence of human habitation from Neanderthals to the Iron Age, and beautiful Magdalenian cave paintings.

Geography 

Busturialdea is located at the north of the province of Biscay, limiting with the comarcas of Lea-Artibai on the east, Uribe and Greater Bilbao on the west and Durangaldea on the south. The Bay of Biscay limits at north.

The comarca is located along the Urdaibai estuary, which has been named Biosphere Reserve by UNESCO in 1984

Municipalities

References

External links

Comarcas of Biscay